Gilat is a moshav in southern Israel. Located in the western Negev desert between Beersheba and Ofakim, it falls under the jurisdiction of Merhavim Regional Council.

History
The moshav was founded in 1949 by Jewish refugees from an Arab country, Tunisia. Like the names of two other moshavim (Tifrah, Ranen) in the area its name was taken from the Book of Isaiah 35:2:
(The desert,) it shall blossom abundantly, and rejoice even with joy and singing.

Notable residents include Aharon Uzan, a government minister between the 1960s and 1980s, and Pini Badash, a former Knesset member.

References

Moshavim
Populated places established in 1949
Populated places in Southern District (Israel)
Tunisian-Jewish culture in Israel
1949 establishments in Israel